J. B. Ragatz was a member of the Wisconsin State Assembly.

Biography
He later went into business in Prairie du Sac, Wisconsin.

Political career
Ragatz was elected to the Assembly in 1904. He was also a member of the village council of Prairie du Sac and of the county board of Sauk County, Wisconsin. He was a Republican.

References

People from Honey Creek, Sauk County, Wisconsin
Republican Party members of the Wisconsin State Assembly
Wisconsin city council members
Businesspeople from Wisconsin
1862 births
Year of death missing
People from Prairie du Sac, Wisconsin